The Patapsco River  mainstem is a  river in central Maryland that flows into the Chesapeake Bay.  The river's tidal portion forms the harbor for the city of Baltimore. With its South Branch, the Patapsco forms the northern border of Howard County, Maryland. The name "Patapsco" is derived from the Algonquian pota-psk-ut, which translates to "backwater" or "tide covered with froth."

History
Captain John Smith was the first European to explore the river noting it on his 1612 map as the Bolus River.  The "Red river", was named after the clay color, and is considered the "old Bolus", as other branches were also labeled Bolus on maps.   As the river was not navigable beyond Elkridge, it was not a major path of commerce with only one ship listed as serving the northern branch, and four others operating around the mouth in 1723.

The Patapsco River is referred to as The River of History as it is regarded  as the center of Maryland’s Industrial Revolution beginning in the 1770s. Milling and manufacturing operations abounded along the river throughout the eighteenth and nineteenth centuries, generally relying on water power generated by multiple small dams. The nation’s first railroad, the Baltimore and Ohio Railroad's original main line was constructed in 1829 and ran west along the Patapsco Valley; and this route remains, though much altered. Many old railroad bridges were constructed in the valley, most notably the Thomas Viaduct, which is still intact, and the Patterson Viaduct, of which ruins remain. Flour mills and the hydropower dam, Bloede Dam, built in 1907, were formerly powered by the river.

The valley is prone to periodic flooding. Modern floods include the 1868 flood that washed away 14 houses and killed 39 people around Ellicott City. A 1923 flood topped bridges while in 1952, an  wall of water swept the shops of Ellicott City. A 1956 flood inflicted heavy damage at the Bartigis Brothers plant. In 1972, as a result of rainfall from the remnants of Hurricane Agnes, Ellicott City and the Old Main Line sustained serious damage.  The July 2016 Maryland flood ravaged Main Street leaving two dead, followed just two years later by a flash flood on May 27, 2018 that took the life of one rescuer.

The mouth of the Patapsco River forms Baltimore harbor, the site of the Battle of Baltimore during the War of 1812.  This is where Francis Scott Key, while aboard a British ship, wrote "The Star-Spangled Banner," a poem later set to music as the national anthem of the United States. Today, a red, white, and blue buoy marks the spot where  was anchored.

Geography

Watershed
Through most of its length, the Patapsco is a minor river, flowing for the most part through a narrow valley. The last , however, form a large tidal estuary inlet of Chesapeake Bay. The inner part of this estuary provides the harbor of Baltimore, composed of the Northwest Harbor and the Middle Branch including Thoms Cove. (See Baltimore Inner Harbor.) The Patapsco estuary is south of the Back River and north of the Magothy River. The Patapsco River forms the harbor as it empties into the Chesapeake Bay. Besides Baltimore, the river also flows through Ellicott City (the county seat of Howard County) and Elkridge.

The  South Branch rises further west at Parr's Spring, where Howard County, Carroll, Frederick, and Montgomery counties meet. The South Branch Patapsco River traces the southern boundary of Carroll County and the northern boundary of Howard County. The first land record regarding Parr's Springs dates from 1744, when John Parr laid out a  tract he called Parr's Range. During the Civil War, Parr's Spring was a stop for the Army of the Potomac's Brig. Gen. David M. Gregg's cavalry, on June 29, 1863, while en route to Gettysburg, Pennsylvania. Parr's Spring was dug to form a  pond in the 1950s, filled by seven spring heads that form the headwaters of the South Branch of the Patapsco River.

The North Branch flows  southward from its origins in Carroll County. Liberty Dam and its reservoir, located on the North Branch, is a major component of the Baltimore city water system.

The river cuts a gorge 100–200 feet (35–70 m) deep within the park, which features rocky cliffs and tributary waterfalls. Bloede's Dam, a hydroelectric dam built in 1906, was located on the Patapsco River within the Park. It was a nearly complete barrier to anadromous fish passage. Although a fish ladder was installed in 1992, it blocked five of six native fish species trying to run upstream to spawn. Impetus to remove Bloede's Dam began in the 1980s when nine drowning deaths occurred, and also to restore fish passage to a large portion of the Patapsco River watershed. Dam demolition began on September 12, 2018, opening the fishery and creating a rocky rapid for kayaking. Two dams upstream of Bloede's Dam, Simkins and Union, were removed in 2010.

Tributaries

 Deep Run (Carroll County)
 Board Run (Baltimore County)
 Roaring Run (Carroll County)
 Liberty Reservoir (Carroll/Baltimore Counties)
 Piney Run (Carroll County)
 Keysers Run (Baltimore County)
 Beaver Run (Carroll County)
 Norris Run (Baltimore County)
 Timber Run (Baltimore County)
 Middle Run (Carroll County)
 Morgan Run (Carroll County)
 Locust Run (Baltimore County)
 Snowdens Run (Carroll County)
 Falls Run (Baltimore County)
 South Branch Patapsco River 
 Davis Branch (Howard County)
 Brice Run (Baltimore County)
 Bens Run (Baltimore County)
 Cedar Branch (Baltimore County)
 Miller Run (Baltimore County)
 Sucker Branch (Howard County)
 Tiber River (Howard County)
 Cooper Branch (Baltimore County)
 Bonnie Branch (Howard County)
 Sawmill Branch (Baltimore County)
 Cascade Falls (Howard County)
 Soapstone Branch (Baltimore County)
 Rockburn Branch (Howard County)
 Deep Run (Howard/Anne Arundel County)
 Stony Run (Anne Arundel County)
 Herbert Run (Baltimore County)
 Holly Creek (Anne Arundel County) 
 Middle Branch to Gwynns Falls (Baltimore City)
 Northwest Harbor to Jones Falls (Baltimore City)
 Colgate Creek (Baltimore City)
 Curtis Creek (Baltimore City)
 Bear Creek (Baltimore County)
 Cox Creek (Anne Arundel County)
 Stoney Creek (Anne Arundel County)
 Rock Creek (Anne Arundel County)
 Old Road Bay (Baltimore County)
 Bodkin Creek (Anne Arundel County)

Ecology and conservation
Removal of Bloede's Dam in September, 2018 opened up  of the Patapsco River watershed, which will potentially restore spawning runs of at least six species of native anadromous fish: alewife (Alosa pseudoharengus), blueback herring (Alosa aestivalis), American shad (Alosa sapidissima), hickory shad (Alosa mediocris), striped bass (Morone saxatilis), sea lamprey (Petromyzon marinus), as only one species, sea lamprey, were found using the Bloede's Dam fish ladder in 2012. One catadromous species would likely also benefit, the American eel (Anguilla rostrata), a fish species that lives in freshwater and migrates to the ocean to breed. The Bloede's Dam removal project was led by American Rivers and the Maryland Department of Natural Resources.

Now that Bloede's Dam has been removed, removal of Daniels Dam upstream on the mainstem Patapsco River would open to anadromous fishes the remaining  of Patapsco River mainstem, the entire  length of the South Branch Patapsco River,  of the North Branch Patapsco River up to the Liberty Dam, and many of these rivers' tributaries.

Water quality
The eastern portion of the Patapsco River is in a highly urbanized area and is subject to extensive stormwater runoff and other forms of water pollution. The Maryland Department of the Environment has identified the Lower North Branch as containing high levels of heavy metals (chromium, arsenic, cadmium, copper, mercury, nickel, lead, selenium, and zinc), as well as phosphorus, fecal coliform bacteria, and PCBs. The Piney Run Reservoir on the South Branch of the Patapsco is polluted by excess levels of phosphorus and sediment.

Clean-up efforts by the residents of surrounding communities have been led by environmental nonprofit organizations, such as The Friends of Patapsco Valley & Heritage Greenway, Inc. (PHG). From 2006 to 2012, PHG volunteers participated in 183 stream clean ups, removing 264 tons of trash from the streams of the Patapsco Valley watershed.

Recreation 
There is recreational swimming in areas of the Patapsco River, sometimes involving rope swings, inner tubing, and wading. The river also serves as a venue for rafting.
The Patapsco is also great for fishing. Parts of Patapsco State Park stocked in the early spring by MD DNR, and offer some pretty decent trout fishing. The Northern Snakehead has also made the Patapsco their home. They can be found from historic Ellicott City all the way into the harbor. They're a great fighting gamefish, and are absolutely delicious.

Crossings
This is a list of all crossings of the main stem of the Patapsco River and selected crossings of its three main tributaries.  Listings start downstream and continue upstream to the sources of the rivers.

See also
Patapsco Vallis, a valley on Mars named after the river in Maryland
Bloede's Dam
List of Maryland rivers
List of parks in the Baltimore–Washington metropolitan area
Liberty Reservoir

References

Chesapeake Bay Program Watershed Profile: Patapsco/Back River 
Patapsco Valley State Park

External links

Maryland DNR's Surf Your Watershed: Patapsco/Back River
American Rivers, a nonprofit conservation organization
Maryland Port Administration
Blue Water Baltimore, formed in 2010 from a merger of the Gwynns Falls, Jones Falls, Herring Run, and Baltimore Harbor Watershed associations, and the Baltimore Harbor Waterkeeper
Patapsco Heritage Greenway
Patapsco River Rock Building

 
Rivers of Anne Arundel County, Maryland
Bodies of water of Baltimore
Rivers of Carroll County, Maryland
Rivers of Howard County, Maryland
Rivers of Maryland
Tributaries of the Chesapeake Bay